Ferd is a Norwegian holding company which holds partial ownership in companies within industry and finance as well as a real estate portfolio. The company has 75 employees and is owned by Johan H. Andresen and his two daughters Katharina and Alexandra; it was established in 2001. The group also has a number of venture and private equity holdings.

The company's name ferd is a Norwegian word meaning journey.

Business

The company operates in several business areas including:

Ferd Capital and Ferd Invest, an investor in private and public companies in Norway making investments from the company's balance sheets
Ferd External Managers, a fund of funds making investments in hedge funds, private equity funds and mutual funds
Ferd Real Estate, manages approximately 70,000 square meters of real estate

History
The company was founded in 2001, when Tiedemanns-Joh. H. Andresen DA and Hartog & Co AS were merged to form the current Ferd AS. The company's history dates back to 1849, when the Andresen family acquired J. L. Tiedemanns Tobaksfabrik, a tobacco factory. The original tobacco company was sold to Skandinavisk Tobakskompagni in 1998.

Ownership
Ferd's portfolio consists, among others, of the private holdings in:
 Swix
 Elopak
 Mestergruppen
 Interwell
 Aibel
 mnemonic
 Servi Group
 Fürst Medisinske Laboratorium
 Infotjenester Group
 Desenio AB

References

External links
Ferd (company website)

Holding companies of Norway
Real estate companies of Norway
Real estate companies established in 2001
Companies based in Bærum
Private equity companies of Norway